Tlstá (meaning fat in Slovak) is a mountain in the Bralná Fatra part of the Greater Fatra Range, measuring . It has rugged slopes with many rock spires and rock terraces under the grass-covered summit. Together with the opposite Ostrá Mountain and Gader Valley beneath them, they create one of the most valuable and picturesque parts of the Greater Fatra Range.

References 

Veľká Fatra
Mountains of Slovakia
Mountains of the Western Carpathians